Liscomb Township is a township in Marshall County, Iowa, USA.

History
Liscomb Township was established in 1869.

References

Townships in Marshall County, Iowa
Townships in Iowa